Judi Rohrig is an American horror writer and editor from Indiana. She attended Indiana University Bloomington where she studied a B.S. in Education and English and graduated in 1978. When not working on writing she has worked in marketing, journalism and teaching. Rohrig writes horror short stories and non fiction. She won the Bram Stoker Awards in 2005 for editing Hellnotes and a Richard Laymon award in 2001. Rohrig has worked as editor for other magazines and has been published in a number of genre magazines including Crime Time, Cemetery Dance, Extremes 5, Dreaming of Angels, Masques V and Stones. She was postmaster for the Horror Writers Association up to 2006.

Bibliography
Short fiction
Still Crazy After All These Years (1999)
Blind Mouths (2001)
Elenora's Silver Box (2002)
A Thousand Words (2006)
Flesh to Bone (2006)Revolution: Number 9 (2007)Falls the Shadow (2009)Tunes from Limbo, But I Digress'' (2013)

References and sources

Indiana University Bloomington alumni
American short story writers
American editors
Year of birth missing (living people)
Living people